The 2008 Navy Midshipmen football team represented the United States Naval Academy (USNA) as an independent during the 2008 NCAA Division I FBS football season. The team was led by first-year head coach Ken Niumatalolo. He was promoted from the offensive line coach before the season, after his predecessor, Paul Johnson, accepted the head coaching position at Georgia Tech.

The Midshipmen finished the regular season with an 8–4 record to attain bowl eligibility. Navy secured a berth in the inaugural EagleBank Bowl, which had a tie-in with the two independent military academies, the other being Army. The other tie-in was with the Atlantic Coast Conference (ACC). Due to a chaotic and closely contested season in the ACC, in the EagleBank Bowl, Navy ended up playing Wake Forest in a re-match of a regular season game, despite a statement in their contracting disallowing it. Unlike the earlier game, Navy lost the rematch against Wake Forest, 29–19.

Schedule

References

Navy
Navy Midshipmen football seasons
Navy Midshipmen football